This is a list of what are intended to be the notable top hotels by country, five or four star hotels, notable skyscraper landmarks or historic hotels which are covered in multiple reliable publications. It should not be a directory of every hotel in every country:

Easter Island
Iorana Hotel, Isla de Pascua

Ecuador
Arashá Spa
Hotel Plaza Grande, Quito	
Madre Tierra Resort and Spa, Vilcabamba

Egypt

 Cairo Marriott Hotel, Cairo
 Coralia, Dahab
 El-Gouna, Red Sea Riviera
 Ghazala Gardens hotel, Sharm el-Sheikh
 Grand Hyatt Cairo, Cairo
 Hilton Taba, Taba
 Maritim Jolie Ville Resort, Sharm el-Sheikh
 Mövenpick Hotels & Resorts
 Old Winter Palace Hotel, Luxor
 Rotana Hotels, Cairo
 San Stefano Grand Plaza, Alexandria
 Shepheard's Hotel, Cairo
 Sofitel Cairo El Gezirah, Cairo

El Salvador
Hilton Princess San Salvador Hotel, San Salvador

Estonia

Ethiopia
Churchill Hotel, Addis Ababa
Delano Hotel, Bahir Dar
Plaza Hotel, Addis Ababa

References

E